This is a list of notable people from Pathanamthitta District.

Politicians and political activists

 K. Kumar (1893 - 1973) – President of the Travancore Congress Committee/KPCC, AICC working Committee Member Also known as 'Elanthur Gandhi' and 'Travancore Kumar'.
 Pandalam Kerala Varma – poet
 Pandalam Sudhakaran – former Minister
 K. K. Nair – founder of Pathanamthitta district and MLA representing the district 34 years
 Adoor Prakash – Attingal Member of Parliament and Ex Revenue Minister
 Mathew T. Thomas – former Transport Minister

Judiciary
 Justice (retired) M. Fathima Beevi – first woman on the Supreme Court of India

Spiritual leaders
Poykayil Yohannan
K C John
 Abraham Mar Thoma, MarthomaXVII and Marthoma Metropolitan, 
Juhanonon Mar Thoma, MarthomaXVIII and Marthoma Metropolitan
Alexanderer Mar Thoma, MarthomaXIX and Marthoma Metropolitan, 
Philipose Mar Chrysostom, MarthomaXX and Marthoma Valiya Metropolitan
Joseph Mar Thoma, MarthomaXX1 and Marthoma Metropolitan
Baselios Thoma Didymos I, Catholicos of the East and Malankara Metropolitan
 Geevarghese Mar Ivanios
 V. C. Samuel, World Council of Churches 
 Thomas Mar Athanasius 
 Kuriakose Mar Clemis
 Nitya Chaitanya Yati
 Yuhanon Mor Militos
 Sadhu Kochu Kunju Upadesi
 Baselios Cleemis
 Sabu Koshy Cherian

Writers
Sugathakumari
 Mahakavi Pandalam Kerala Varma – poet, Daivame kaithozham kaakkumarakenam – is written by Keralavarma.
 Kadammanitta Ramakrishnan
 K. V. Simon - poet
 Benyamin (writer) – Kerala Sahitya Akademi award winner
 Muloor S. Padmanabha Panicker
 Vennikulam Gopalakurup (1902–1980) – poet
 P. K. Gopi – poet

Artists , painters and cartoonists
 V. S. Valiathan – Classical Painter and Winner of Raja Ravi Varma Puraskaram.
 P. K. Manthri – Political Cartoonist and Creator of  Cartoon characters Pachuvum Gopalanum
 C. K. Ra –Painter
 Jitheshji  - World's Fastest Cartoonist and Initiator of the art genre Varayarangu
 Paris Viswanathan- Painter

Film and stage
 Mohanlal – actor
 Thilakan – actor
 Adoor Gopalakrishnan – film director
 K. G. George – film director
 B. Unnikrishnan – film director
 Blessy – film director
 Captain Raju – actor, director, producer
 Aju Varghese – actor
 Kailash (actor) – actor
 Dr. Rajiv Pillai – actor
 Sidhartha Siva – actor, director
 Kaviyoor Sivaprasad – director, screenwriter
 Adoor Bhasi – actor
 M.G. Soman – actor
 Prathapachandran – actor
 Nayanthara – actress
 Meera Jasmine – actress
 Parvathy Jayaram – actress
 Samyuktha Varma – actress
 Mythili – actress
 Urmila Unni – actress
 Utthara Unni – actress
 Kaveri – actress
 Kaviyoor Ponnamma – actress
 Aranmula Ponnamma – actress
 Adoor Bhavani – actress
 Adoor Pankajam – actress

Kathakali, Padayani and other performing artists
 Kadammanitta Vasudevan Pillai – Padayani Exponent
 C. J. Kuttappan – former Chairman of Folklore Academy

Journalists
 T. J. S. George – senior journalist and Kerala Sahitya Akademi Award Winner
 George Varghese – director of Prasar Bharati
 Elanthoor Kumarji (1893 - 1973) – veteran freedom activist

Others
 M. George Muthoot
 George Alexander Muthoot

Notes and references

 
Lists of people from Kerala